UK Tour '75 is a live album by Irish rock band Thin Lizzy, recorded at Derby College in Derby, England, on 21 November 1975 as part of the tour promoting the Fighting album. Released in 2008, UK Tour '75 was authorised by the surviving band members and the content was digitally remastered under their supervision.

Some of the songs had not yet been released on Thin Lizzy studio albums, such as "Cowboy Song", dubbed "Derby Blues" on the night by lead singer Phil Lynott.

Track listing
"Fighting My Way Back" (Phil Lynott) – 3:51
"It's Only Money" (Lynott) – 3:54
"Wild One" (Lynott) – 4:24
"For Those Who Love to Live" (Brian Downey, Lynott) – 5:06
"Still in Love with You" (Lynott) – 9:22
"Showdown" (Lynott) – 5:32
"Suicide" (Lynott) – 5:07
"Rosalie" (Bob Seger) – 3:59
"The Rocker" (Eric Bell, Downey, Lynott) – 3:55
"Sha La La" (Downey, Lynott) – 7:09
"Baby Drives Me Crazy" (Downey, Scott Gorham, Lynott, Brian Robertson) – 6:24
"Me and the Boys" (Lynott) – 6:43
"Cowboy Song" ("Derby Blues") (Downey, Lynott) – 6:49
"Little Darling" (Lynott) – 3:13
"Sound Check Jam" (Downey, Gorham, Lynott, Robertson) – 2:47

Personnel
Thin Lizzy
Phil Lynott – bass guitar, lead vocals
Scott Gorham – lead guitar, backing vocals
Brian Robertson – lead guitar, backing vocals
Brian Downey – drums, percussion

Production
John Moon, Geoff Woodward, John Arnold - engineers
Dave Blackman - pre-production sequencing
Richard Evans - mastering
Mike Dixon - MLP producer

References

2008 live albums
Thin Lizzy live albums